Federal Dam may refer to a location in the United States:

Federal Dam (Troy) on the Hudson River at Troy, New York
Federal Dam, Minnesota, a small city